Casey Patterson (born April 20, 1980) is a professional American beach volleyball player based out of Huntington Beach, CA. Patterson and his former teammate, Jake Gibb, were named the USAV Team of the Year as well as AVP Team of the Year for 2013. Casey himself was named AVP Best Offensive Player for 2013. He has had a total of fifteen 1st-place finishes during his professional career.

Patterson and Gibb competed for the United States in beach volleyball at the 2016 Summer Olympics.

References

External links 
 
 

1980 births
Living people
American men's beach volleyball players
People from Van Nuys, Los Angeles
Olympic beach volleyball players of the United States
Beach volleyball players at the 2016 Summer Olympics
Sportspeople from Huntington Beach, California